Fallersleben is a part (Ortsteil) of the City of Wolfsburg, Lower Saxony, Germany, with a population of 11,269 (as of 2010). The village of Fallersleben was first mentioned in 942 under the name of Valareslebo. Fallersleben became a city in 1929, and was incorporated into Wolfsburg in 1972. Before 1972, it belonged to Gifhorn. In 1939, Fallersleben had 2,600 inhabitants.

Notable residents
 August Heinrich Hoffmann von Fallersleben (1798-1874), romantic poet best known for writing "Deutschlandlied", anthem of Germany.

References
 History of Wolfsburg at wolfsburg.de

Towns in Lower Saxony